Gawthrop is a hamlet in the South Lakeland district, in the county of Cumbria, England. Historically part of the West Riding of Yorkshire, it lies within the Yorkshire Dales National Park. It is near the River Dee and the village of Dent.

See also

Listed buildings in Dent, Cumbria

References 

Hamlets in Cumbria
Dent, Cumbria